Paul Paviot (11 March 1926 – 23 November 2017) was a French film director and screenwriter. He directed 17 films between 1952 and 1974.

Selected filmography
 A Slice of Life (1954)

References

External links

1926 births
2017 deaths
French film directors
French male screenwriters
French screenwriters
Writers from Paris